Glennys Reynolds Farrar (born 1946) is a professor of physics at New York University who specializes in particle physics, cosmology and the study of dark matter. She has made several significant contributions to the fields of hadron and dark matter phenomenology, helping to develop the working "Standard Cosmological Model". Farrar is a figure in developing many modern particle-search techniques, achieving numerous recognitions including as the Guggenheim Fellowship for Natural Sciences and Sloan Fellowship. She holds a faculty position at New York University (NYU), where she has been since 1998.

Education

Farrar obtained a bachelor's degree at UC Berkeley in 1968, being one of the first undergraduate students to enroll in graduate courses in the physics department. After graduating from UC Berkeley, Farrar went on to earn her PhD from Princeton in 1971, becoming the first woman to receive a physics PhD from Princeton. During this time she began studying Hindi alongside her physics endeavors, culminating in an independent studies program at Delhi University.

Career
After graduating from Princeton, Farrar held post-doctoral positions the Institute for Advanced Study and Caltech. During her time at Caltech, Farrar improved the current understanding of the Pion form-factor, and proposed a new model for elastic nucleon scattering. She accepted a faculty position at Rutgers University in 1979, where her work continued to probe Standard Model interactions and contemporary developments in Supersymmetric string theory. Farrar joined the physics faculty at NYU in 1998, where she currently resides. While at NYU, she chaired the physics department and founded the Center for Cosmology and Particle Physics.

Farrar has garnered several honors for her achievements in theoretical physics. In 1975, she was awarded a Sloan Research Fellowship, and received a Guggenheim Fellowship in 1984. She was elected in 2003 a Fellow of the American Association for the Advancement of Science (AAAS). In 2014 and 2021, Farrar was selected as a Simons Fellow in Theoretical Physics. She was also the chair of the Division of Astrophysics (DAP) of the American Physical Society for the 2021-2022 period.

Farrar has expend many years of her career working on understanding the sources of the highest-energy comic rays. She has significantly contributed to the research conducted by the Pierre Auger Observatory, with more than one-hundred publications in this experiment alone. As a theoretical physicist she has worked on developing tools for particle-detection from high energy sources in the universe. In 2012, Ronnie Jansson (then a graduate student) and Farrar, published an article presenting a new model of the galactic magnetic field.

References

External links
 Glennys Farrar Discovers Particles and Life as a Woman
 What Glennys Farrar Covets is more hours in the day
NYU Physicist Proposes New Theory For Origin And Make-Up Of Extremely High-Energy Cosmic Rays
Students Build A System to Solve A Cosmic Puzzle; A Series of Particle Detectors In Schools Across the City
Glennys Farrar on Researchgate
https://www.ias.edu/scholars/glennys-farrar
BY STUDYING BOTH THE TINIEST AND MOST MASSIVE PHENOMENA, A PIONEERING CENTER PUSHES THE FRONT LINES OF PHYSICS RESEARCH

American women physicists
1946 births
Living people
New York University faculty
Princeton University alumni
Sloan Research Fellows
University of California, Berkeley alumni
Women astrophysicists
Fellows of the American Association for the Advancement of Science
Fellows of the American Physical Society
American women academics
21st-century American women